Tirumala formosa, the forest monarch or beautiful tiger, is a butterfly of the family Nymphalidae.

Description
The uppersides of the forewings are black with several white spots and a reddish-brown basal area. The uppersides of the hindwings are black, with a series of small white spots and a large hyaline basal area. The body is black with white spots. The undersides of the wings are similar to the uppersides, but the colours are paler.

This species is mimicked (Batesian mimicry) by the Kenyan forms of the regal swallowtail (Papilio rex).

The larvae feed on Secamone - S. micrandra, S. platystigma, S. punctulosa, S. zambesiaca and Periploca linearifolia.

Distribution
Tirumala formosa can be found in tropical Africa (Cameroon, Ethiopia, Kenya and Tanzania).

Habitat

Subspecies
 T. f. formosa — eastern Kenya - east of the Rift Valley, north-eastern Tanzania
 T. f. mercedonia (Karsch, 1894) —  western Kenya - west of Rift Valley, Uganda, Rwanda, Burundi, north-western Tanzania
 T. f. morgeni (Honrath, 1892) — Cameroon
 T. f. neumanni (Rothschild, 1902) —  Ethiopia

References

 Biolib
 Mark C. Williams - Butterflies and Skippers of the Afrotropical Region
Seitz, A. Die Gross-Schmetterlinge der Erde 13: Die Afrikanischen Tagfalter. Plate XIII 23 a morgeni, b mercedonia, formosa

Butterflies described in 1880
Tirumala (butterfly)
Butterflies of Africa
Taxa named by Frederick DuCane Godman